Loreti is an Italian surname. Notable people with this name include:

Giovanni Battista Loreti (1686–1760), Italian painter
Mario Loreti, Italian architect of the Civic Tower (Varese)
Nicanor Loreti, Argentine filmwriter of Kryptonita
Paola Loreti, Italian mathematician
Robertino Loreti (born 1947), Italian singer

Italian-language surnames